Joseph Halsted McGee Jr. (born April 6, 1929) is an American former politician in the state of South Carolina. He served in the South Carolina House of Representatives from 1963 to 1968, representing Charleston County, South Carolina. He is a lawyer and judge. His son-in-law is comedian Stephen Colbert.

References

1929 births
Living people
Politicians from Charleston, South Carolina
Democratic Party members of the South Carolina House of Representatives
South Carolina state court judges
South Carolina lawyers
Lawyers from Charleston, South Carolina